This is a list of the governors of the province of Parwan, Afghanistan.

Governors of Parwan Province

See also
 List of current governors of Afghanistan

References

Parwan